Leo E. Litwak (May 28, 1924 – July 27, 2018) was an American short story writer and novelist.

Life
He attended Wayne State University and Columbia University.  He taught at San Francisco State University.  He was a medic in World War II, which was the subject of his 2001 memoir, The Medic: Life and Death in the Last Days of WWII.

His work appeared in The New York Times and TriQuarterly. 
His papers are held at Washington University Libraries.

Litwak's daughter is playwright Jessica Litwak. He had two granddaughters. He was the son of union leader Isaac Litwak, whose life was the basis of Leo Litwak's novel, Waiting for the News.

Awards
 1970 Guggenheim Fellow
 1970 National Jewish Book Award for Waiting for the News
 1990 O. Henry Award

Works
 "The Eleventh Edition" TriQuarterly, No. 74, Winter 1989

Novels
 To the Hanging Gardens (1964) Andre Deutsch
 Waiting for the News (1969)

Non-fiction
 College Days in Earthquake Country (1971)
 Medic 2001

Anthologies

Criticism

References

External links
"Leo Litwak Recreates The Medic", The San Francisco Reader'', Jerry Karp

1924 births
2018 deaths
American short story writers
Wayne State University alumni
Columbia University alumni
San Francisco State University faculty
O. Henry Award winners